Donald Tai Loy Ho (August 13, 1930 – April 14, 2007) was a Hawaiian traditional pop musician, singer and entertainer. He is best known for the song "Tiny Bubbles" from the album of the same name.

Life and career
Ho was a singer of Native Hawaiian, Chinese, Portuguese, Dutch, and German descent. He was born in the small Honolulu neighborhood of Kakaako to Emily (Honey) Leimaile Silva and James Ah You Puao Ho, but he grew up in Kāneohe on the windward side of the island of Oahu. He was a graduate of the Kamehameha Schools in 1949 and he attended Springfield College on a football scholarship in 1950, but returned home to earn a Bachelor's degree in sociology at University of Hawai'i in 1953. In 1954, Ho entered the United States Air Force doing his primary training at Columbus AFB, Mississippi and spent time flying C-97s with the Military Air Transport Service. Transferred to Travis AFB, California, he went to the local city of Concord and bought an electronic keyboard from a music store, and recalls, "That's when it all started."

Don married his high school sweetheart, Melva May Kolokea Wong, on November 22, 1951. She was the mother to his first six children. They were married for 48 years, until Melva's death on June 8, 1999. While in the military, Ho traveled from state to state with his young family until he was called home to help his mother with the family bar business called Honey's.

Ho left the United States Air Force in 1959 due to his mother's developing illness and began singing at her club in Kaneohe. Honey's became a hotspot for the local entertainment and the growing customers from the Kaneohe Marine Base servicemen. Ho always honored the military remembering his own years of military service. In 1963, he moved the Kāneohe Honey's to Waikīkī. After much success, and little room to grow, promoter Kimo Wilder McVay sought Don to play at a night club called Duke's owned by Duke Kahanamoku, where he caught the attention of record company officials.

Ho was originally signed to Reprise Records. Ho released his debut album, The Don Ho Show!, in 1965 and began to play high-profile locations in Las Vegas, Lake Tahoe and New York City. In 1966 he released his second album, a live compilation called Don Ho – Again!, which charted in the early part of that year. In the fall of 1966, Ho released his most famous song, "Tiny Bubbles", which charted on both the pop (#57 Billboard) and easy listening charts and caused his subsequent album, also called "Tiny Bubbles", to remain in the album Top 200 for almost a year. Another song associated with Don was "Pearly Shells". From 1964 to 1969, Don's backing group was The Aliis: Al Akana, Rudy Aquino, Benny Chong, Manny Lagodlagod and Joe Mundo.

In his stage show, Ho would make jokes about being sent in the mid-1950s to Keesler Air Force Base, Mississippi and being Hawaiian. Don Ho enjoyed asking for a show of hands of veterans of World War II. He would ask for all the Pearl Harbor survivors to stand. He would tell the men from the European Theater, "you got your glory in the movies" that they could watch. The veterans of the Pacific Theater were invited on stage to join the hula dancers.

Ho's music used typical 1960s pop arrangements, which meant light instrumentation and Hammond organs. He was well-positioned to capitalize on the newly admitted state's growing popularity as a tourist destination during the decade due to cheap air travel and the popularity of Tiki bars. His shows would be attended by celebrities in addition to ordinary tourists.

During the second half of the decade, a growing movement emerged in Hawaii to produce more traditional forms of music that subtly accused Ho of being too commercialized and marketed to tourists. His popularity never seriously suffered however, and his shows remained popular with vacationers.

Guest appearances on television series such as I Dream of Jeannie, The Brady Bunch, Sanford and Son, Batman, Charlie's Angels, McCloud and Fantasy Island soon followed. Although his album sales peaked in the late 1960s, he was able to land a television series on ABC from October 1976 to March 1977 with The Don Ho Show variety program which aired on weekday mornings.

Ho had ten children: six with his wife and four more from two subsequent relationships. His children often worked with him, either onstage, backstage, or with his business. He loved to work with his children, teaching them the entertainment business. His daughter Hoku performed with him in his Waikīkī show and in 2000 went on to become a nationally known recording artist in her own right. In 2005, he sang a song that was used as the opening theme to the direct-to-video and DVD movie Aloha, Scooby-Doo!.

Illness
Ho lived at his Diamond Head residence, raising his young family with their mothers. In 1995, at age 65, Ho suffered a mild stroke and his health began a steady decline. By 2002, he had developed cardiomegaly, an enlarged heart, unrelated to coronary artery disease, leaving him with only 30% of normal cardiac capacity. Despite his failing health, Ho was always hopeful, and resilient to find a solution to his health issues. He also continued his nightly performances, making a few concessions such as trading in his glass of Scotch that he kept on top of his piano at shows for pineapple juice.

Ho was diagnosed with cardiomyopathy in 2005 and had a pacemaker implanted. Ho still experienced a number of problems afterwards, including an episode when his pacemaker malfunctioned during a concert. On another occasion, he was making repairs to the roof of his house when his heart suddenly started racing. He contacted a biotechnology company specializing in treating heart conditions with adult stem cells working in conjunction with Dr. Shoa, cardiac surgeon and pioneer of the use of adult stem cells for heart disease. On December 6, 2005, Ho had his own blood-derived stem cells injected into his heart by Amit Patel and his fellow surgeons in Thailand. The treatment went without incident and it was reported that his heart would be boosted back to 75% capacity. Later in the month, Ho said, "I'm feeling much better and I'm so happy I came up here to do it." In regard to his health problems, he remarked "I'd been going around for years acting like I was 40. And then when all this happened, someone told me 'You're 75.' Everyone gets old. Why did I think I was exempt?"

In September 2006, Ho married Haumea Hebenstreit, who was a production assistant for his show at the Waikīkī Beachcomber. A few days later, Ho went into cardiac arrest. Although he had had a new pacemaker installed on September 16, 2006, he collapsed and died in his Waikīkī apartment from heart failure on April 14, 2007. He was cremated and his ashes were scattered at sea.

Since Ho's death, his estate has been in limbo because of numerous management conflicts and legal changes that transpired while he was struggling with his mental and physical health.

Personal life

Relationships and children 
Ho married twice and had ten children by three women.

 Melva May Kolokea Wong (August 17, 1932 – June 8, 1999) m. November 22, 1951
 Donald "Donnie" Ho, Jr. (May 28, 1952 - March 20, 2010)
 Donalei Ho
 Dayna Kolokea Ho-Henry (February 21, 1955 – May 11, 2007)
 Dondi Kaleinani Ho-Costa
 Dorianne "Dori" Ho
 Dwight Ho, m. Lydia Ho
 Haumea Hebenstreit m. September 2006
 Elizabeth Guevara
 Kea Ho
 Kealii Ho
 Patricia Swallie
 Hoku Christian Ho Clements
 Kaimana Grace Ho

References

External links

 
 Don Ho's autobiography, DON HO: My Music, My Life with Jerry Hopkins. 
 Obituary from the Sydney Morning Herald
 Obituary on the Star Bulletin

1930 births
2007 deaths
Male actors from Hawaii
Musicians from Honolulu
Singers from Hawaii
Songwriters from Hawaii
American male film actors
American male pop singers
American male television actors
American musicians of Chinese descent
American musicians of Portuguese descent
Traditional pop music singers
Hawaiian ukulele players
Male actors from Honolulu
American military personnel of Native Hawaiian descent
United States Air Force airmen
Mountain Apple Company artists
Kamehameha Schools alumni
University of Hawaiʻi alumni
20th-century American male actors
20th-century American musicians
20th-century American singers
Hawaii people of Chinese descent
Hawaii people of Portuguese descent
Reprise Records artists
20th-century American male singers
American male songwriters